The 2020–21 FC Khimki season was the club's 24th season in existence and the first season back in the top flight of Russian football. In addition to the domestic league, Khimki participated in this season's editions of the Russian Cup. The season covers the period from 26 July 2020 to 30 June 2021. Khimki finished the season 8th in the league, and where knocked out of the Russian Cup by Krylia Sovetov in the Round of 16.

Season events
On 1 August, manager Sergei Yuran was relieved of duty his duties as manager, with Dmitri Gunko being appointed as his replacement the same day. Gunko left the club by mutual consent on 21 September, with Igor Cherevchenko being appointed as his successor on 25 September.

Squad

Out on loan

Transfers

In

Loans in

Out

Loans out

Released

Friendlies

Competitions

Overview

Premier League

League table

Results summary

Results by round

Matches

Russian Cup

Round of 32

Knockout stages

Statistics

Appearances and goals

|-
|colspan="14"|Players away from the club on loan:
|-
|colspan="14"|Players who left Khimki during the season:

|}

Goalscorers

Clean sheets

Disciplinary record

References

External links
 

FC Khimki seasons
Khimki